Dean Raymond Hooper (born 13 April 1971) is an English retired professional football full back who played for Swindon Town and Peterborough United in the Football League.

Honours 
Kingstonian

Isthmian League Premier Division: 1997–98
 Surrey Senior Cup: 1997–98

Aldershot Town

 Isthmian League Premier Division: 2002–03

Career statistics

References

External links

1971 births
Living people
People from Harefield
English footballers
Brentford F.C. players
Yeading F.C. players
Hayes F.C. players
Swindon Town F.C. players
Peterborough United F.C. players
Stevenage F.C. players
Kingstonian F.C. players
Dagenham & Redbridge F.C. players
Aldershot Town F.C. players
St Albans City F.C. players
Lewes F.C. players
Cambridge United F.C. players
English Football League players
Chalfont St Peter A.F.C. players
Marlow F.C. players
Isthmian League players
National League (English football) players
Association football fullbacks